Mohamed Daf (born 13 March 1994) is a Senegalese footballer who currently plays as a midfielder for Diaraf

External links

1994 births
Living people
Senegalese footballers
R. Charleroi S.C. players
RWS Bruxelles players
Boavista F.C. players
ASC Jaraaf players
Altay S.K. footballers
Al-Orobah FC players
Belgian Pro League players
Challenger Pro League players
Senegal Premier League players
TFF First League players
Saudi First Division League players
Association football midfielders
Expatriate footballers in Belgium
Expatriate footballers in Portugal
Expatriate footballers in Turkey
Expatriate footballers in Saudi Arabia
Senegalese expatriate sportspeople in Belgium
Senegalese expatriate sportspeople in Portugal
Senegalese expatriate sportspeople in Turkey
Senegalese expatriate sportspeople in Saudi Arabia